Carnage is a synonym for a massacre, meaning the killing of many people. 

Carnage may also refer to:

Films and shows
Carnage (2002 film), a French film
Carnage (2011 film), directed by Roman Polanski
Carnage (2017 film), directed by Simon Amstell
A Bay of Blood, a 1971 Mario Bava horror film titled Carnage in the United States
Crash (also known as Carnage), a 1998 television show, about Car safety
Venom: Let There Be Carnage, a 2021 American superhero film featuring the Marvel Comics character Carnage, directed by Andy Serkis.

Music
Carnage (band), a Swedish death metal band
Carnage (Lair of the Minotaur album), a 2004 album by Lair of the Minotaur
Carnage (Nick Cave and Warren Ellis album), a 2021 album by Nick Cave and Warren Ellis

People
Sean Carnage, film director and producer
Carnage the Executioner (born 1974), Twin Cities-based Minnesota rapper
Carnage (DJ) (born 1991), Guatemalan DJ and record producer
Nathan "Carnage" Corbett (born 1979), 11-time Muay Thai World Champion.

Other uses
Carnage (character), a Marvel Comics supervillain
The Carnage Crew, a professional wrestling tag team
Carnage UK, an organisation that arranges student parties throughout the UK
Carnage Gaming Convention, held in early November in Vermont
Carnage Middle School, a middle school in downtown Raleigh, NC

See also